Hussein Nurmatov (born 18 September 2000) is a Tajikistani professional football player who currently plays for FC Khatlon.

Career

International
Nurmatov made his senior team debut on 13 December 2018 against Oman.

Career statistics

International

Statistics accurate as of match played 16 December 2018

References

External links
 

2000 births
Living people
Tajikistani footballers
Tajikistan international footballers
Association football defenders